Azzano may refer to places in Italy.

Municipalities (comuni)
Azzano d'Asti, in the Province of Asti
Azzano Decimo, in the Province of Pordenone
Azzano Mella, in the Province of Brescia
Azzano San Paolo, in the Province of Bergamo
Castel d'Azzano, in the Province of Verona

Civil parishes (frazioni)
Azzano (Mezzegra), in the municipality of Mezzegra (Province of Como)
Azzano (Premariacco), in the municipality of Premariacco (Province of Udine)
Azzano (Spoleto), in the municipality of Spoleto (Province of Perugia)
Azzano (Seravezza), in the municipality of Seravezza (Province of Lucca)